Huangshan, literally meaning the Yellow Mountain(s), is a mountain range in southern Anhui Province in eastern China. It was originally called “Yishan”, and it was renamed because of a legend that Emperor Xuanyuan once made alchemy here.

The area is well known for its scenery, sunsets, peculiarly-shaped granite peaks, Huangshan pine trees, hot springs, winter snow and views of the clouds from above. Huangshan is a frequent subject of traditional Chinese paintings and literature, as well as modern photography. It is a UNESCO World Heritage Site and one of China's major tourist destinations.

Physical description

The Huangshan mountain range has many peaks, some more than 1,000 meters (3,250 feet) high. The three tallest and best-known peaks are Lotus Peak (Lianhua Feng, 1,864 m), Bright Peak (Guangming Ding, 1,860 m) and Celestial Peak (Tiandu Feng, literally Capital of Heaven Peak, 1,829 m). The World Heritage Site covers a core area of 154 square kilometres and a buffer zone of 142 square kilometres. The mountains were formed in the Mesozoic, approximately 100 million years ago, when an ancient sea disappeared due to uplift. Later, in the Quaternary Period, the landscape was shaped by the influence of glaciers.

The vegetation of the area varies with elevation. Mesic forests cover the landscape below 1,100 meters. Deciduous forest stretches from 1,100 meters up to the tree line at 1,800 meters. Above that point, the vegetation consists of alpine grasslands. The area has diverse flora, where one-third of China's bryophyte families and more than half of its fern families are represented. The Huangshan pine (Pinus hwangshanensis) is named after Huangshan and is considered an example of vigor because the trees thrive by growing straight out of the rocks. Many of the pine trees in the area are more than a hundred years old and have been given their own names (such as the Ying Ke Pine, or Welcoming-Guests Pine, which is thought to be more than 1500 years old).  The pines vary greatly in shape and size, with the most crooked of the trees being considered the most attractive. Furthermore, Huangshan's moist climate facilitates the growing of tea leaves and the mountain has been called "one of China's premier green tea-growing mountains. Mao feng cha ("Fur Peak Tea"), a well-known local variety of green tea, takes its name from the downy tips of tea leaves found in the Huangshan area.

The mountaintops often offer views of the clouds from above, known as the Sea of Clouds or "Huangshan Sea" because of the cloud's resemblance to an ocean, and many vistas are known by names such as "North Sea" or "South Sea." One writer remarked on the view of the clouds from Huangshan as follows:

The area also is host to notable light effects, such as the renowned sunrises. Watching the sunrise is considered a "mandatory" part of visiting the area.  A phenomenon known as Buddha's Light is also well-known and, on average, Buddha's Light only appears a couple of times per month. In addition, Huangshan has multiple hot springs, most of them located at the foot of the Purple Cloud Peak. The water stays at 42 °C (107.6 °F) all year, and has a high concentration of carbonates. The waters are said to help prevent skin, joint, and nerve illness.

History

Huangshan was formed approximately 100 million years ago and gained its unique rock formations in the Quaternary Glaciation.

During the Qin dynasty, Huangshan was known as Yishan (Mount Yi). In 747 AD, its name was changed to Huangshan (Mount Huang) by imperial decree; the name is commonly thought to have been coined in honor of Huang Di (the Yellow Emperor), a legendary Chinese emperor and the mythological ancestor of the Han Chinese. One legend states that Huangshan was the location from which the Yellow Emperor ascended to Heaven. Another legend states that the Yellow Emperor "cultivated moral character and refined Pills of Immortality in the mountains, and in so doing gave the mountains his name. The first use of this name "Huangshan" often is attributed to Chinese poet Li Bai. Huangshan was fairly inaccessible and little-known in ancient times, but its change of name in 747 AD seems to have brought the area more attention; from then on, the area was visited frequently and many temples were built there.

Huangshan is known for its stone steps, carved into the side of the mountain, of which there may be more than 60,000 throughout the area. The date at which work on the steps began is unknown, but they have been said to be more than 1,500 years old.

Over the years, many scenic spots and physical features on the mountain have been named; many of the names have narratives behind them. For example, one legend tells of a man who did not believe the tales of Huangshan's beauty and went to the mountains to see them; almost immediately, he was converted to the same view. One of the peaks he is said to have visited was named Shixin, roughly meaning "start to believe."

In 1982, Huangshan was declared a "site of scenic beauty and historic interest" by the State Council of China. It was named a UNESCO World Heritage Site in 1990 for its scenery and for its role as a habitat for rare and threatened species. Subsequently, certified as a National Geopark, and then as a regional geopark (Asia Pacific Geopark Network), it was admitted as a UNESCO Global Geopark in 2004.

In 2002, Huangshan was named the "sister mountain" of Jungfrau in the Swiss Alps.

Artistic and scientific inspirations

Much of Huangshan's reputation derives from its significance in Chinese arts and literature. In addition to inspiring poets such as Li Bai, Huangshan and the scenery therein has been the frequent subject of poetry and artwork, especially Chinese ink painting and, more recently, photography. Overall, from the Tang dynasty to the end of the Qing dynasty, more than 20,000 poems were written about Huangshan, and a school of painting named after it. The mountains also have appeared in modern works; director James Cameron cited Huangshan as one of his influences in designing the fictional world of his 2009 film Avatar, and Chinese animated series Stitch & Ai, a spin-off of Disney's Lilo & Stitch franchise, is set in the Huangshan mountains.

The area also has been a location for scientific research because of its diversity of flora and wildlife. In the early part of the twentieth century, the geology and vegetation of Huangshan were the subjects of multiple studies by both Chinese and foreign scientists. The mountain is still a subject of research. For example, in the late twentieth century a team of researchers used the area for a field study of Tibetan macaques, a local species of monkey.

Tourism

Having at least 140 sections open to visitors, Huangshan is a major tourist destination in China. Huangshan City changed its name from Tunxi in 1987 in order to promote Huangshan tourism. In 2007 more than 1.5 million tourists visited the mountain. The city is linked by rail and by air to Shanghai, and also is accessible from cities such as Hangzhou, Zhejiang and Wuhu, Anhui. Buses connect Huangshan City to the base of the mountain, where visitors can take a cable car or hike to the summit.

There are more than 50 kilometers of footpaths providing access to scenic areas for visitors and staffers of the facilities. Throughout the area there are hotels and guest houses that accommodate overnight visitors, many of whom hike up the mountains, spend the night at one of the peaks to view the sunrise, and then descend by a different route the next day. The area is classified as a AAAAA scenic area by the China National Tourism Administration.

The hotels, restaurants, and other facilities at the top of the mountain are serviced and kept stocked by porters who carry resources around the mountain on foot, hanging their cargo from long poles balanced over their shoulders or backs.

Climate
Huangshan has a humid continental climate (Köppen Climate Classification Dfb).  Its elevation makes it colder and wetter than the rest of Anhui.

Panoramas

Image gallery

See also
 List of World Heritage Sites in China
 Sacred Mountains of China

References

Bibliography

External links 

 Huangshan overview by the Huangshan Management Committee
 Huangshan Mountain Travel Guide by Huangshan China International Travel Service
 Huizhou Geography Essay by Huizhou Geography

AAAAA-rated tourist attractions
Landforms of Anhui
Global Geoparks Network members
Huangshan City
Mountain ranges of China
Tourist attractions in Anhui
World Heritage Sites in China
Geoparks in China
Highest points of Chinese provinces
Parks in Anhui